This list of gold mines in the United States is subsidiary to the list of mines article and lists working, defunct and future mines in the country and is organised by the primary mineral output. For practical purposes stone, marble and other quarries may be included in this list.

Alaska-Gastineau Mine
Atlantic Cable Quartz Lode
Battle Branch Mine
Bodie Mine
Boundary Red Mountain Mine
Calhoun Mine
Commonwealth Mine
Congress Mine
Consolidated Mine
Cortez Gold Mine (active)
Cripple Creek & Victor Gold Mine (active)
Crisson Mine
Empire Mine (California; inactive)
Fort Knox Gold Mine (active)
Franklin-Creighton Mine
Free Jim Mine
Getchell Mine (active)
Golden Sunlight mine (active)
Goldstrike mine (active)
Greenwood Gold Mine
Homestake Mine (Nevada)
Homestake Mine (South Dakota)
Keane Wonder Mine
Kensington mine
Kennedy Mine
Loud Mine
Malakoff Mine (California; inactive)
Marigold mine (active)
McLaughlin Mine
Monte Cristo Gold Mine
North Bloomfield Mining and Gravel Company
North Star Mine
Reed Gold Mine
Red Hill mine
Round Mountain Gold Mine
Sixes mine
Sweet Vengeance Mine (inactive)
Twin Creeks Gold Mine (active)
Vulture Mine

See also
List of gold mines in Georgia

References

Gold
United States